Gryllodes is a genus of crickets in the family Gryllidae and tribe Gryllini.  Species have been recorded in Australia, Asia, Africa (Ethiopia), central Europe, subtropical and tropical Americas.

The type species, Gryllodes sigillatus, may be called the tropical or Indian house cricket: a cosmopolitan species that is cultured for pet-food.

Species 
Gryllodes includes the following species:
Gryllodes flavispina Saussure, 1877
Gryllodes sigillatus (Walker, 1869) - type species (as Gryllus sigillatus Walker F)
Gryllodes supplicans (Walker, 1859)

References

External links
 
 

Ensifera genera
Gryllinae
Orthoptera of Africa
Orthoptera of Asia